Ashfield Halt railway station served Ashfield in County Down, Northern Ireland. Sited 2 miles south of Dromore the station was served by the line from Lisburn to Banbridge.

History

Built by the Great Northern Railway (Ireland), and closed by that concern in 1956.

The site today 
There is no trace of the station left today.

References 

 
 

Disused railway stations in County Down
Railway stations opened in 1863
Railway stations closed in 1956
1863 establishments in Ireland
1956 disestablishments in Northern Ireland
Railway stations in Northern Ireland opened in the 19th century